Interstate 76 may refer to:

Interstate Highways in the United States
 Interstate 76 (Colorado–Nebraska)
 Interstate 76 (Ohio–New Jersey), running through Pennsylvania

Video gaming
 Interstate '76,  a vehicular combat video game for Windows

76